Aberdeen is an unincorporated community and coal town located in Butler County, Kentucky, United States.

History

Geography
Aberdeen is located in central Butler County, at the junction of U.S. Highway 231 and Kentucky Routes 70 and 79, just across the bridge over the Green River from Morgantown. All three routes lead southwest to Morgantown immediately across the bridge. US 231 leads northwest to Cromwell and Beaver Dam. KY 70 leads east to Roundhill and Brownsville, and KY 79 leads northeast to Caneyville. The community can also be accessed directly from the Exit 33 interchange of Interstate 165 near the Butler/Ohio County line.

Post office
Aberdeen has a local post office with ZIP code 42201.

References

Unincorporated communities in Butler County, Kentucky
Unincorporated communities in Kentucky
Coal towns in Kentucky